Niranjan Mukundan (born 4 September 1994) is an Indian para-swimmer. He was crowned as the Junior World Champion in the year 2015.

Early years
Niranjan was born in Bangalore with spina bifida; he has an incomplete development of the spinal cord and clubbed feet. With the support of his parents, he started learning swimming and progressed very quickly. Niranjan attended the Jain University in Bangalore for higher education.

Career

Early career

Niranjan claimed the silver medal twice in 50m butterfly at the Paralympic nationals in Mumbai, 2004–2005 and Kolkata, 2005–2006. At the state aquatic championships in Bangalore he won silver medal in 2007 and bronze in 2009 in water polo.

Later career
2012 was a fruitful year for Niranjan, at the national swimming championship in Chennai, he won three gold medals, one silver in swimming and one bronze in water polo. Niranjan won his first international medal, a bronze in 200m freestyle at the IDM German Swimming Championship in Berlin.

In 2013 he won more international medals at the IWAS World Junior Games in Puerto Rico, clinching two silver in 100m freestyle and butterfly along with two bronze medals in 100m backstroke and 50m freestyle. He soon became world number 17. At the 13th para national swimming championship in Bangalore, he won one gold, a silver and two bronze medals.

At the 2014 IWAS World Junior Games in Stoke Mandeville, U.K. Niranjan won a whopping eight medals, three gold, two silver and three bronze.

On 1 November 2015, he won the state's prestigious Kannada Rajyotsava Prashasti. He also received the National Award (best sportsman with disability) for his exceptional achievement in the field of sports, at Vigyan Bhavan, Delhi. He won 10 medals (7 gold and 3 silver) in the World Junior Games held at Stadskanaal, Netherlands and was also crowned as the Junior World Champion.

At the 2016 IWAS Junior World Games in Prague, Czech Republic, Niranjan won eight more medals, also three gold, two silver and three bronze. He was honoured to have delivered the athletes' oath in front of his fellow competitors.

Personal

Niranjan hails from a middle-class family from Bangalore. His father used to work as independent consultant and mother works in a corporate company. Born with a medical condition called spina bifida and with clubbed feet, he underwent as many as sixteen surgeries. He was advised by the doctors to undergo swimming to strengthen his leg muscles. His mother took him to the swimming club in Jayanagar, Bangalore and it is here that coach John Christopher spotted and promised to turn him into an international level swimmer.

Awards and recognition 

 2016 – Ekalavya Award
 2015 – National Award for Best Sports-person of the Year by Government of India
 2015 – Achiever's Award from Dr. Chenraj Roychand, founding chairman, The JGI Group

References

External links
Blog, Jain University
Finding Tadpoles
"Disability is no bar", Bangalore Mirror

1994 births
Paralympic swimmers of India
Living people
Sportspeople with club feet
Swimmers from Bangalore
People with spina bifida
Recipients of the Rajyotsava Award 2015
Swimmers at the 2020 Summer Paralympics
Swimmers at the 2022 Commonwealth Games
Commonwealth Games competitors for India
20th-century Indian people
21st-century Indian people